Zielęcin  is a village in the administrative district of Gmina Rząśnia, within Pajęczno County, Łódź Voivodeship, in central Poland.

The village has an approximate population of 500.

References

Villages in Pajęczno County